Johannes Beilharz (born 15 January 1956) is a German poet, painter and translator.

Beilharz was born in Oberndorf am Neckar, Baden-Württemberg, attended local schools, studied English, French, Spanish and Catalan at the University of Regensburg from 1975 to 1977, then continued his studies at the University of Colorado in 1977, graduating with an M.A. in English Literature/Creative Writing in 1981. He has worked mainly in translation and has traveled widely, primarily in the United States, Mexico, Europe and Asia. He has lived in Boulder, Colorado and Salida, Colorado, Stuttgart, Germany and currently lives in Pliezhausen, Germany and Rome, Italy.

Johannes Beilharz writes in German as well as English and has published poetry, fiction and poetry translations from several languages in numerous print and online magazines since 1978. A volume of his short stories (Die gottlosen Ameisen) was published in 2003.

He has had solo art exhibitions and participated in group exhibitions in France, Germany, India and Italy since 2002 and appeared in public readings, partially with jazz and Indian musicians, in Germany since 2003.

Poets he has translated include Gabriel Ferrater, Barbara Guest, John Ashbery, Kenneth Koch, Harry Mathews, Edward Dorn, John Tranter, Kabir, Rabindranath Tagore, Friedrich Hölderlin, Hugo von Hofmannsthal, Ingeborg Bachmann and Erwin Einzinger.

Publications
Rural Ditties (English; self-published, 1980)
Minima Amoralia (German; self-published, 1981)
Die gottlosen Ameisen (German; Alkyon Verlag, 2003)
Best of Meme (English; Wordclay, Bloomington, Indiana, USA 2008)
101 (English; epubli, Berlin, Germany 2014)
Eine finnische Jazznummer für die Missverstandenen (German; epubli, Berlin, Germany 2014)

See also
 List of German painters

External links
Johannes Beilharz's literature and art pages
Official homepage

1956 births
Living people
People from Oberndorf am Neckar
Writers from Baden-Württemberg
20th-century German painters
20th-century German male artists
German male painters
21st-century German painters
21st-century German male artists
English-language poets
German male poets